Beaudricourt is a commune in the Pas-de-Calais department in the Hauts-de-France region in northern France.

Geography
A small farming village located 18 miles (28 km) west of Arras on the D23 road.

Population

Sights
 The church, dating from the nineteenth century.

See also
Communes of the Pas-de-Calais department

References

Communes of Pas-de-Calais